Ana Martínez Collado (born 1950) is a Spanish art theorist, feminist and writer on aesthetics.

Martínez Collado has edited Ramón Gómez de la Serna’s writings on aesthetics and written about his reaction to modern art. In 2006 she curated an exhibition on cyberfeminism at the Museum for Modern Art in Castellón de la Plana.

Works
 (ed.) Una teoría personal del arte: antología de textos de estética y teoría del arte by Ramón Gómez de la Serna, 1988
 La complejidad de lo moderno: Ramón y el arte nuevo, 1996
 Tendenci@s: perspectivas feministas en el arte actual, 2005

References

1950 births
Living people
Spanish editors
Spanish women editors
Spanish art historians
Spanish women historians
Spanish feminists